Berzelia abrotanoides, commonly known as redlegs, is a species of flowering plant in the family Bruniaceae native to the Western Cape region of South Africa. The foliage and dried flower heads are used in the cut flower industry.

References

Bruniaceae
Endemic flora of South Africa
Taxa named by Adolphe-Théodore Brongniart
Taxa named by Carl Linnaeus